Right There may refer to:

"Right There" (Nicole Scherzinger song), 2011
"Right There" (Ariana Grande song), 2013
Right There (film), 2013